Seize the Time may refer to:

 Seize the Time (book), a 1970 book by Bobby Seale
 Seize the Time, a 1994 album by Fun-Da-Mental
 Seize the Time (album), a 2006 album by Flattbush